Black Astrum is an English business card manufacturer based in London and the Royal County of Berkshire. The company specialises in made to order diamond encrusted business and members cards, supplying them across Europe, the Middle East and Asia. The company offers its signature cards on a strict invitation-only basis with each card custom designed according to customers' specifications. The product has been included in Tatler magazine's 'Object of Desire' and Millionaire Asia's 'Must have item for men'.

The Signature card 
Black Astrum's signature cards are made out of Swiss Hesa-Glas  with scratch and chemical resilient coating. Each card is rumored to cost around $1,500, with pricing dependent on the number of diamonds encrusted on each card.

History 
Black Astrum originally started as a result of a one-off request from a wealthy Middle Eastern family. The founder of the company Sufian Khawaja, pleased with the final design, decided to launch Black Astrum officially in 2011 and sell the cards to a select, wealthy few. Khawaja himself has a background in design and engineering and resides in the county of Berkshire, England.

References

External links
 
 Lens Multimedia Plastic Cards

Business cards
Luxury
Companies established in 2011